Enrique Silva Cimma (November 11, 1918 – July 14, 2012) was a Chilean politician, academic and lawyer. Silva served as Foreign Minister of Chile from 1990 to 1994. In addition to a long political career, Silva taught at the University of Chile for much of his life. He wrote more than thirty books, many focusing on law.

Enrique Silva was born on November 11, 1918, in Iquique, Chile.

Silva began his public career by serving as Comptroller General of Chile from 1959 to 1967.

He was chosen as the leader of the Radical Party and became a member of the International Socialist Bureau in 1983. He also joined the Social Democrat Radical Party.

Silva was a founding member of the Party for Democracy, which was formed in 1987. He was a leading member of Patricio Aylwin's presidential campaign during the 1989 presidential election. In 1990, Chilean President Patricio Aylwin appointed Silva as Foreign Minister, a position he held until 1994.

Silva was appointed a Senator by the Supreme Court of Chile, serving an eight-year term from 1998 to 2006.

Enrique Silva died of a bronchial obstruction at his home on July 14, 2012, at the age of 93. Survivors included his son-in-law, former congressman Nelson Avila.

References

1918 births
2012 deaths
Foreign ministers of Chile
Members of the Senate of Chile
Party for Democracy (Chile) politicians
Radical Party of Chile politicians
Radical Social Democratic Party of Chile politicians
Academic staff of the University of Chile
People from Iquique